The Madness is the second studio album by American rock band Art of Anarchy, released on March 24, 2017. It is the first album to feature former Creed vocalist Scott Stapp since the passing of former member Scott Weiland in 2015. According to the website Loudwire.com, the band took "a new direction" with their music on the album.

Reception

Chad Childers from Loudwire reviewed the album, stating "The musicianship is strong, the writing connects and they have a disc that could go deep in terms of radio singles. The Madness is just the beginning of what looks like a bright future".

Track listing

Personnel
Ron "Bumblefoot" Thal – lead guitar, backing vocals
Jon Votta – lead and rhythm guitar, backing vocals
Scott Stapp – lead vocals
John Moyer – bass guitar, backing vocals
Vince Votta – drums, percussion

References

2017 albums
Art of Anarchy albums